Miranda Connell (born 3 August 1938, Stansted, Essex, England) is an English actress.

Early life and education
She attended Elmhurst Ballet School and the Cheltenham Ladies' College, then appeared on stage in Stratford-upon-Avon and the West End.

Career
On television she is best known for being a Play School presenter from May 1966 to April 1975. She also appeared as Lady Agatha in the 1957 film The Admirable Crichton, and in various cult TV shows including The Avengers, Dixon of Dock Green, Armchair Theatre, Paul Temple and Special Branch.

Personal life
She is married to actor Edward de Souza.

External links

1938 births
Living people
British television presenters
BBC television presenters
People from Stansted Mountfitchet
People educated at the Elmhurst School for Dance